The Duchy of Kalisz was a feudal district duchy in the Greater Poland, centered on the Kalisz Region. Its capital was Kalisz. The state was established in 1177, in the partition of the Duchy of Greater Poland, after the rebellion against Mieszko III. Duke Casimir II the Just of the Piast dynasty become its first ruler. It existed until 1279, when, it got united with duchies of Gniezno and Poznań, under the rule of Przemysł II, forming the Duchy of Greater Poland. It remained a fiefdom within the Duchy of Poland, until 1227, and after that, it become an independent state.

Citations

Notes

References

Bibliography 
Andrzej Wędzki, Kalisz w państwie wczesnopiastowskim i w okresie rozbicia dzielnicowego. In: Władysław Rusiński (redactor), Dzieje Kalisza. Poznań: Wydawnictwo Poznańskie, 1977.
Józef Dobosz, Kazimierz II Sprawiedliwy
Bronisław Nowacki, Przemysł II
Jerzy Wyrozumski, Historia Polski do roku 1505

Former countries in Europe
Former monarchies of Europe
Duchies of Poland
Fiefdoms of Poland
History of Poland during the Piast dynasty
Kalisz
History of Greater Poland
12th-century establishments in Poland
13th-century disestablishments in Poland
States and territories established in 1177
States and territories disestablished in 1279